Rise of the Nazis is a British documentary series about the rise and fall of Adolf Hitler and the Nazi Party. The first series aired in 2019, followed by the second and third series in 2022. Several historians and military experts give their perspective on the events. A fourth series focusing on the Nuremberg trials has been planned.

Episodes

Series 1 (2019)

Series 2 (2022)

Series 3: The Downfall (2022)

Response 
A review of the first series in The Times described the first series as a lesson in 'how easily — and petrifyingly quickly — a democratic country can move to a totalitarian dictatorship.'  A TV Insider review of the American release on PBS a little over a year later described the series as "riveting" and "as gripping as any fictional thriller." A more critical review by James Delingpole in the conservative publication The Spectator suggested that the first series made inappropriate comparisons to political developments at around the time of its production, such as Brexit and the presidency of Donald Trump, concluding that "it's time the BBC gave up trying to pretend it's a voice of impartial authority".

A short review in The Guardian said of the second series that "bringing something new to TV coverage of the second world war is no mean feat, but this narratively gripping take on the eastern front comes very close." A more detailed review in The Telegraph was complimentary of the series summarising it as "television that is informative, intelligent and surprising – if only there was more of this on BBC Two."

References

External links
 
 

2019 British television series debuts
2010s British documentary television series
2020s British documentary television series
BBC television documentaries about history during the 20th Century
Documentary television series about World War II
English-language television shows
Works about Adolf Hitler